Hulimavu is a locality in the south of Bangalore under the Bommanahalli Zone of Bruhat Bengaluru Mahanagara Palike (BBMP).

History
Hulimavu was previously known as Amarapura, which came under the administration of Saarakeya 
(present day: Sarakki). Apparently Amarapura was derived from the word "Amra" or "Amru" which translates to Mango or "Sourness". Over years the name has evolved to its present name Hulimavu which in Kannada literally means "Sour mango". The then ruler of Saarakeya (17th century) is believed to have built the Kodandarama Swami Temple in Hulimavu for the well being of its citizens. Around 1600AD the temple was renovated with the installation of idols of Seeta, Lakshmana and Anjenaya Swami. Sri Kodandarama Swami Bramhostava is celebrated every year. The temple was renovated again in 2002.

Landmarks
Sri Ramalingeshwara Cave Temple,Meenakshi temple Royal Meenakshi Mall, and Hulimavu Lake are some known landmarks in the locality. Apollo and Fortis Hospitals on Bannerghatta Road are some of the hospitals in the vicinity. Indian Institute of Management(IIMB), School of Business Studies and Social Sciences of CHRIST (Deemed to be University), ITM Business School, BGS National Public School and AECS Maaruti Magnolia school are some educational institutions near Hulimavu.

Accessibility
Hulimavu is located on Bannerghatta Road and is connected to most other parts of the city by BMTC bus services. Connectivity is supposed to further improve with the locality figuring in the Bangalore Metro Phase 2 plans. Cab services like Uber, Ola, Rapido and Bounce cater to the locality along with autorickshaw services.

References

Neighbourhoods in Bangalore